The Montenegro men's national volleyball team represents Montenegro in international men's volleyball competitions and friendly matches. The national volleyball team was formed in 2006, recently after independence. Montenegro has been a full member of FIVB and CEV since 2006.

Montenegro played their first official match on 1 September 2007 in Podgorica and won against Latvia (3–1).

Until 2017, at major tournaments, Montenegro played in FIVB World League and European League. Montenegro made main success at 2014, winning the gold medal in European League.

History
Soon after the 2006 Montenegrin independence referendum, the Volleyball Federation of Montenegro founded national teams. The men's team started to play in 2007, with the first match against Latvia (3–1, Olympic Games qualifiers).

From 2007 to 2013, Montenegro played three times in European Championship qualifiers, but without significant success. At the same time, the team played two times in qualifiers for Olympic Games and once in qualifiers for World Championship.

First better result, Montenegrin team made at 2013, on their debut in  European League. After 12 games, Montenegro won fifth place among 12 European teams. A year later, Montenegrin volleyball team made their major success until today, with the gold medal in European League 2014. In the finals, Montenegro won both games against Greece (3–1, 3–2).

After the result in European League, during summer 2015, Montenegro debuted in FIVB World League. As a member of Pool C, Montenegro won the group at first stage of World League and qualified for final tournament (Pool B promotion) in Bratislava. At semifinals, Montenegro eliminated China (3–1). In the final game, Montenegro lost against Egypt (2–3), so they didn't qualify for World League Pool B competition. In the end, Montenegro won 22nd position in 2015 FIVB World League.

A year later, Montenegro played in 2016 FIVB Volleyball World League, again in Pool C, but didn't make similar result as 2015. Montenegro finished World League season as a fourth-placed team in Pool C, but didn't qualify for the final tournament. The reason was that Germany, as a host nation, directly qualified for the finals.

In summer 2016, Montenegro played in the main round of 2017 Men's European Volleyball Championship qualification, but failed to qualify for the final tournament. Same result, Montenegrin team made in 2018 World Championship qualifiers, finishing as a third placed team in Group D.

Biggest success for Montenegrin team came at 2019. After the games against Slovakia, Moldova and Iceland, they qualified for European Championship 2019.

Competitive record
Until now, Montenegro never played on World Championship or Olympic Games. They participated in European Volleyball Championship  (2), FIVB Volleyball World League (3) and European Volleyball League (2).
Biggest success of the team was gold medal at 2014 Men's European Volleyball League.

World Championship
Montenegro men's national volleyball team participated in the qualifiers for one World Championship (2014), but never played at main competition.

As of May 30, 2018

European Championship
Montenegro men's national volleyball team played five times in the qualifiers for European Championship (2009, 2011, 2013, 2015, 2017), but never played at main competition.

Olympic Games
Montenegro men's national volleyball team played two times in the qualifiers for Olympic Games (2008, 2012), but never played at main competition.

European League
Montenegro men's national volleyball team played twice in Men's European Volleyball League, with the gold medal from 2014 edition. That was the main success in the history of Montenegrin national volleyball team.

World League
Montenegro men's national volleyball team played three times in FIVB Volleyball World League (2015, 2016 and 2017). At their first performance, Montenegro won 22nd place and played on Pool C final tournament. Year later, Montenegro won 29th place in FIVB World League and in 2017 finished in 31st place.

Head coaches
Since 2007, the national team of Montenegro has been led by six different head coaches. Most successful coach were Slobodan Boškan, who won the gold medal on European League with Montenegrin team and Veljko Bašić, who led Montenegro to 2019 European Volleyball Championship and 2021 European Volleyball Championship. 

Sources: 

 

* Statistics correct as of end 2021 European Volleyball Championship.

Official matches 

Montenengro played its first official match in September 2007. There is a list of official matches of the Montenegro men's national volleyball team.

Opponents
Below is the list of performances of Montenegro men's national volleyball team against every opponent.

* Statistics correct as of end 2021 European Volleyball Championship.

Current squad
The following is the Montenegrin roster in the 2017 World League.

Head coach:  Veljko Basić

See also
 List of official matches of the Montenegro men's national volleyball team
 Volleyball Federation of Montenegro (OSCG)
 Montenegrin Volleyball League

References

External links
 
 FIVB profile

National men's volleyball teams
Volleyball men
Volleyball in Montenegro
Men's sport in Montenegro